Mark Ferreira (born 1 March 1967) is a former professional tennis player from India. He is the son of former Indian billiards player Michael Ferreira.

Biography
Born in Bombay, he did his schooling from St Andrew's High School Bandra. He studied economics at UCLA and played on the collegiate tennis team.

At the 1988 Wimbledon Championships, Ferreira and partner Zeeshan Ali made the main draw as lucky losers and reached the second round.

Ferreira competed in the doubles main draws of Grand Prix tournaments at Seoul and Singapore in 1989.

He represented both India and Hong Kong in Davis Cup competition. In 1989 he featured in a tie for India against South Korea, appearing in the doubles rubber with Zeeshan Ali, which they lost in four sets. Due to his business career he was later based in Hong Kong and in 1997 played two Davis Cup ties for his adopted country, against both Thailand and Saudi Arabia.

See also
List of India Davis Cup team representatives

References

External links
 
 
 

1967 births
Living people
Indian male tennis players
Hong Kong male tennis players
UCLA Bruins men's tennis players
Indian expatriates in Hong Kong
Racket sportspeople from Mumbai